Clarence Walters (1896 – death date unknown) was an American Negro league pitcher in the 1920s.

A native of Illinois, Walters played for the Milwaukee Bears in 1923. In four recorded appearances on the mound, he posted a 6.11 ERA over 17.2 innings.

References

External links
 and Seamheads

Date of birth missing
Year of death missing
Place of birth missing
Place of death missing
Milwaukee Bears players
1896 births
Baseball pitchers
Baseball players from Illinois